Edwin Edward Willis (October 2, 1904 – October 24, 1972) was an American politician and attorney from the U.S. state of Louisiana who was affiliated with the Long political faction. A Democrat, he served in the Louisiana State Senate during 1948 and in the United States House of Representatives from 1949 to 1969. Willis served on the U.S. House of Representatives' Un-American Activities Committee (HUAC).

References

"Edwin E. Willis", A Dictionary of Louisiana Biography, Vol. 2 (1988), p. 853.
 . Retrieved March 10, 2006.

1904 births
1972 deaths
Democratic Party Louisiana state senators
Louisiana lawyers
American planters
People from Arnaudville, Louisiana
People from St. Martin Parish, Louisiana
Loyola University New Orleans College of Law alumni
Democratic Party members of the United States House of Representatives from Louisiana
20th-century American lawyers
20th-century American businesspeople
20th-century American politicians
Farmers from Louisiana
American anti-communists
American segregationists